Labyrinth is a 1991 German–Czech drama film directed by Jaromil Jireš. The film depicts Maximilian Schell playing himself investigating the life and influences of Franz Kafka played by Christopher Chaplin, and marked Jireš's return to film after having worked with television and documentaries for a number of years.

First screened on 22 October 1991 at Laemmle Monica 2 in Los Angeles, Labyrinth received the Critic's Choice at the 1992 American Film Institute International Film Festival.

Cast 
 Vlastimil Brodský
 Christopher Chaplin as Franz Kafka
 Miloš Kopecký as Rabbi Löw
 Maximilian Schell as himself
 Christian Thuri as David

References

External links 

1991 films
Czechoslovak drama films
1990s Czech-language films
1991 drama films
Films directed by Jaromil Jireš
Czech drama films
German drama films